Walter W. Rose was an American politician and real estate developer in Florida.

Rose moved to Florida in 1909. He bought the Ericsson house in 1920. Rose named the streets in the area he platted for colleges. He platted the Rosemere subdivision in Orlando's College Park subdivision and donated land for what is now Dickson Azalea Park along Fern Creek.

He served in the State Senate from 1933 until 1948 as a Democrat.

References

Year of birth unknown
American real estate businesspeople
Democratic Party Florida state senators
20th-century American politicians
20th-century American businesspeople
Businesspeople from Florida